Roberto Serniotti (born 1 May 1962) is an Italian professional volleyball coach. 

A former head coach of many teams in the whole of Europe, among others, Panathīnaïkos Athlītikos Omilos, Tours Volley-Ball, Berlin Recycling Volleys, M. Roma Volley, Trentino Volley. Asseco Resovia,

Career
His career in the top series began in 1992, as 2nd coach at Piemonte Volley. In the Cuneo club he remains uninterruptedly until 2000 (the last year as 1st coach), winning numerous national and international trophies. After two seasons in Greece at Panathīnaïkos Athlītikos Omilos, he sits again on the bench of Piemonte Volley, as first coach until the end of the Serie A1 2002-03.

In 2003 he moved to France, sitting on the bench of Tours Volley-Ball, which led to the height of his triumphs, guiding the transalpine team to the victory of the first and only Champions League (2nd Champions League won by a French team), one French SuperCup and two French Cups.
From 2003 to 2004 he was also the assistant coach of the France with which he won a silver medal at the 2003 European Championship and participated in the 2004 Summer Olympics. From 2005 to 2007, instead, he was assistant coach of the Italy, with which he won the 2005 European Championship, the bronze medal to the 2005 World Grand Champions Cup and the bronze medal to the 2005 Summer Universiade too.

His transalpine adventure was interrupted in 2006, when he was hired by M. Roma Volley. The newborn Roman club, even though it was his first experience, soon achieved prestigious results: in Italy the final of the Italian Cup and of the Italian Supercup, while in the European field he triumphed in the CEV Cup. After two seasons the club decides not to renew its membership to the top division, and Serniotti flies to Russia on the bench of Volejbol'nyj klub Jaroslavič.

From December 29, 2009, until the end of the championship, he is the first coach of Prisma Volley of Taranto.

In 2010 he collaborates again with the French national team coaching Selection B.

On June 21, 2010 he was hired by Trentino Volley, looking for a second coach to join Radostin Stojčev. On the bench of the Trentino team he wins for the first time the Italian championship and the World Cup for clubs, which end up several times in his palmarès. He also triumphed in the Italian Cup, the Italian Supercup and the Champions League.

In the summer of 2013 the club encountered financial difficulties, which forced it to sell many of its strongest players, including Osmany Juantorena, Matej Kazijski, Jan Štokr; among the departures was also the coach Radostin Stojčev, who had reached the end of his contract. Serniotti is promoted to 1st coach of the team, signing a contract renewal of one season, and as his 2nd coach he calls Simone Roscini. The adventure at the helm of the Trentino bench lasts only one season, in which he wins the Italian Supercup and the bronze medal at the World Club Championship. In the Italian Cup he was eliminated in the semifinals by Piacenza, while he placed 4th at the end of the regular season and was then eliminated in the playoff quarter-finals by Modena.

In the 2015-16 season is called to the guide of Berlin Recycling Volleys, in the 1. German Bundesliga He calls as his second the Japanese coach Koichiro Shimbo with whom he obtained excellent results both on the national and European field. This was the year of the "triple": he won the CEV Cup (the first European trophy in the club's history), the German championship and the German Cup (a trophy that had been missing in Berlin for 15 years). The following year, he reconfirmed himself as German champion in addition to leading the German team to the Final Four of the Champions League. At the beginning of the season, they failed to win the German Supercup, which was won by the Friedrichshafen team, which also snatched the German cup won by the Berlin team the previous year.

In the 2017-18 championship he became coach of Asseco Resovia in Polska Liga Siatkówki, but in December 2017 he terminated his contract with the Polish team.

In February 2018 he is called to lead Piemonte Volley in Serie B,<ref>[https://www.cuneodice.it/sport/cuneo-e-valli/se-si-vogliono-ottenere-dei-risultati-bisogna-sporcarsi-le-mani_12651.html Serniotti:'Se si vogliono ottenere dei risultati bisogna sporcarsi le mani] – cuneodice.it – 13.02.2018 – Retrieved 16.08.2021</ref> thus returning to the city that launched him as a coach; despite not being reconfirmed for the following season, in December of the same year he returns to sit on the Cuneo bench, this time in Serie A2, to replace Mauro Barisciani.Cuneo e Serniotti avanti insieme – lavocedialba.it – 22.05.2021 – Retrieved 16.08.2021Cuneo Volley: alla guida ancora coach Roberto Serniotti – ventidisport.it – 05.05.2021 – Retrieved 16.08.2021Roberto Serniotti e il legame con i tifosi di Cuneo: “Speriamo nel loro ritorno al Palazzetto” – lastampa.it – 31.08.2021 – Retrieved 01.09.2021Serniotti: “Ho imparato tanto girando il mondo, ora porto Cuneo in alto” – volleynews.it – 23.12.2020 – Retrieved 16.08.2021

In the 2020-21 season he finished third in the league and was eliminated in the playoff semifinal by Prisma Taranto of Taranto while in the Italian Cup A2/A3 he reached the semifinal losing to Olimpia Bergamo, the team ultimately winning the tournament.

In the 2021-22 championship he reached the final of the Italian Cup A2/A3 thus bringing back, 11 years later, a Cup final at Piemonte VolleyVolley A2M, presentata la finale della Del Monte® Coppa Italia: "Una festa per Cuneo e la pallavolo" – lavocedialba.it – 07.02.2022 – Retrieved 16.02.2022Cuneo soffre, ma vince: 3-1 al Porto Viro. Adesso la finale di Coppa Italia – torino.corriere.it – 02.02.2022 – Retrieved 16.02.2022Cuneo palcoscenico della Finale Del Monte® Coppa Italia A2 – legavolley.it – 05.02.2022 – Retrieved 16.02.2022 against Conad Reggio Emilia, a team that wins at the Cuneo home for 3 to 1, winning the 25th edition. Furthermore, at the end of the regular season he comes third again, thus reconfirming the position of the previous year and this time reaching the final of the playoffsVolley A2/M: la finale playoff sarà Cuneo-Reggio Emilia! – ideaweb.tv - 12.05.2022 - Retrieved 31.05.2022Volley, playoff A2M. 2.437 volte grazie, Cuneo: sei in finale! I Lupi Santa Croce piegati 3-0 in gara-2 – targatocn.it - 08.05.2022 - Retrieved 31.05.2022 where he always meets the Reggio team that imposes itself for 3 to 1 in the Best of Five and gets the move to the SuperLega. With his contract expiring at the end of the season, the club and the coach parted ways.

Honours
National team
 Men's European Volleyball Championship  2005 – with Italy
  2003 – with France

 FIVB Volleyball Men's World Grand Champions Cup  2005 – with Italy

 Volleyball at the 2005 Summer Universiade  2005 – with Italy

Clubs
 FIVB Volleyball Men's Club World Championship  2010/2011 – with Trentino Volley
  2011/2012 – with Trentino Volley
  2012/2013 – with Trentino Volley
  2013/2014 – with Trentino Volley

 CEV Champions League  2004/2005 – with Tours VB
  2010/2011 – with Trentino Volley

 CEV Cup  1995/1996 – with TNT Alpitour Cuneo
  2007/2008 – with M. Roma Volley
  2015/2016 – with Berlin Recycling Volleys

 CEV Cup Winners' Cup  1996/1997 – with TNT Alpitour Cuneo
  1997/1998 – with TNT Alpitour Cuneo

 European SuperCup  1996/1997 – with TNT Alpitour Cuneo
  1997/1998 – with TNT Alpitour Cuneo

 National championships 1995/1996  Italian SuperCup, with TNT Alpitour Cuneo
 1999/2000  Italian SuperCup, with TNT Alpitour Cuneo
 2000/2001  Italian SuperCup, with TNT Alpitour Cuneo
 2010/2011  Italian SuperCup, with Trentino Volley
 2012/2013  Italian SuperCup, with Trentino Volley
 2005/2006  French SuperCup, with Tours VB
 1995/1996  Italian Cup, with TNT Alpitour Cuneo
 1998/1999  Italian Cup, with TNT Alpitour Cuneo
 2011/2012  Italian Cup, with TNT Alpitour Cuneo
 2012/2013  Italian Cup, with TNT Alpitour Cuneo
 2004/2005  French Cup, with Tours VB
 2005/2006  French Cup, with Tours VB
 2015/2016  German Cup, with Berlin Recycling Volleys
 2010/2011  Italian Championship, with Trentino Volley
 2012/2013  Italian Championship, with Trentino Volley
 2015/2016  German Championship, with Berlin Recycling Volleys
 2016/2017'''  German Championship, with Berlin Recycling Volleys

References

External links

 
 Coach profile at LegaVolley.it 
 Coach profile at Volleybox.net''

1962 births
Living people
Sportspeople from Turin
Italian volleyball coaches
Volleyball coaches of international teams
Italian expatriate sportspeople in Greece
Italian expatriate sportspeople in France
Italian expatriate sportspeople in Russia
Italian expatriate sportspeople in Germany
Italian expatriate sportspeople in Poland
Resovia (volleyball) coaches